Buddha's Family is the compilation album by various reggaeton artists, released on September 5, 2001.

Track listing
 Getto – "Por La Envidia"
 Tempo – "Intro"
 Tempo – "Descontrólate"
 Getto – "Tu Cuerpo"
 Trebol Clan – "Ansias Tengo"
 Yanuri and Don Omar – "Bailen"
 Sir Speedy – "Te Invito A Bailar"
 Felo and Speedy – "Entra Felo"
 Enemigo and Mighty Max – "P.R. Tira Tus Manos Al Aire"
 Getto & Gastam – "Buddha's Family"
 Tempo – "Intro Vida Real"
 Tempo – "Contra Men"
 Eddie Dee – "Peleando Por Lo Mío"
 Maestro – "Cascarrabia"
 Gastam and Tempo – "Mano Arriba Criminal"
 Ivy Queen – "Miles de Voces"
 "Boletín de Última Hora"
 Tempo – "Conozcan Otra Parte De Mí"
 Yaviah – "What da Bombo..."
 "Intro Artillería"
 Artillería Secreta – "Tú No Puedes"

Notes
The song "Miles de Voces" by Ivy Queen was later included on Queen's fifth studio album Flashback in 2005.

2001 compilation albums
Reggaeton compilation albums